Whites Branch is a stream in Atchison County in the U.S. state of Missouri.

Whites Branch bears the name of Lewis White, a pioneer settler.

See also
List of rivers of Missouri

References

Rivers of Atchison County, Missouri
Rivers of Missouri